Swedish metal musician from Stockholm, Sweden. Peter is most known for his growling and clean vocals, and front figure role in the Swedish metal band Despite, which he joined as a full-time member in late 2012. Prior to joining Despite he has also been the lead singer of Sweden's thrash metal outfit Carnal Forge, Construcdead and his solo project Godsic. Peter has also played the bass in Swedish metal band Dog Faced Gods where he played on the 1998 album "Random Chaos Theory in Action", and the Swedish rock band Backdraft. He has also releases as a solo artists, which are available on Bandcamp.

Discography 
 1998 – Dog Faced Gods – Random Chaos Theory in Action (Album) – Bass
 2003 – Construcdead - Violadead (Album) – Vocals
 2005 – Construcdead - Wounded (EP) – Vocals
 2010 – Carnal Forge - Blood War (Single) – Vocals
 2013 – Despite - EPic (EP)  – Vocals
 2014 – Despite - Chaos Trigger (Single) – Vocals
 2015 – Despite - Praedonum (Single) – Vocals
 2016 – Despite - Synergi (Album) – Vocals
 2017 – Despite - Breathe (Single) – Vocals
 2019 – Despite - Echo Chamber (Single) – Vocals

References

External links
Despite's official website

Swedish heavy metal singers
Singers from Stockholm
1977 births
Living people
21st-century Swedish singers